Beiguan is a type of traditional music, melody and theatrical performance between the 17th and mid-20th centuries. It was widespread in Taiwan. By the early 21st century its popularity had declined precipitously.

Beiguan usually uses the following instruments: two suona (oboes), bangzi (woodblock), daluo (large bossed gong), xiaoluo (small gong), bangu (high-pitched drum), tonggu (small drum), xiaobo (small cymbals), and dabo (large cymbals) and pipa. It may also use dagu (large drum), various huqin, and plucked instruments.

See also
 Nanguan

External links
Article about Beiguan

Chinese styles of music
Hokkien music